Adenopteryx is a monotypic moth genus of the family Pyralidae. It contains only one species, Adenopteryx conchyliatalis, which is found in Algeria.

References

Chrysauginae
Monotypic moth genera
Endemic fauna of Algeria
Moths of Africa
Pyralidae genera
Taxa named by Émile Louis Ragonot